KDUV (88.9 FM, "Spirit 88.9") is a radio station broadcasting a Contemporary Christian music format. Licensed to Visalia, California, United States, it serves the Visalia-Tulare, Fresno and Bakersfield areas.  The station is owned by Community Educational Broadcasting, Inc. The station was assigned the KDUV call letters by the Federal Communications Commission on February 1, 1991. KDUV is also broadcast on K261CO on 100.1 MHz in Bakersfield, California.

Up until December 26, 2010, KDUV was known by "KDUVfm" on-air. Following a month of Christmas music, the station re-branded itself as "Spirit 88.9."

Programming
The current weekday lineup includes the Brant Hansen Show in the mornings (6 AM - 10 AM PT).  The show consists of music interspersed with positive stories, humor, games, and listener participation. Other station personalities include Amanda Carroll (mid-days, 10 AM - 3 PM PT), Rob Anthony (afternoons, 3 PM - 7 PM PT), a new evening show called "The Fairly Local Show" featuring Chad, Angela, and Jill(7 PM - 11 PM PT), and weekend Tim Collins (Sundays 12 PM - 4 PM PT) and Justin Paul (Sundays, 4 PM - 8 PM).

"Keep The Faith" is a mix of music, interviews and listener participation. It airs from 5 AM - 11 AM Sundays.

The Sunday morning service of a local Visalia church is also broadcast on the station. The Visalia First Assembly program runs 35–40 minutes beginning at 11 AM Sundays.

The station broadcasts talk programs in the early morning Monday - Friday: Focus on the Family (5 AM) and Family Life Today (5:30 AM).

Translators

Previous logo

References

External links

Contemporary Christian radio stations in the United States
DUV
Radio stations established in 1991
1991 establishments in California
DUV